Boca do Monte ("Mouth of the Hill") is a district of the municipality of Santa Maria, in the Brazilian state of Rio Grande do Sul. It is situated in the northwest portion of Santa Maria. The district's seat is located 16 km (9.94 miles) from Downtown Santa Maria.

The district of Boca do Monte owns an area of 307.44 km² that is equivalent to 17.16% of the municipality of Santa Maria that is 1791.65 km².

History 
The district is, with the districts of Sede and Arroio do Só, the most ancient districts of the municipality of Santa Maria.

Limits 

The district limits with the districts of Santo Antão, São Valentim and Sede, and with the municipalities of São Martinho da Serra, São Pedro do Sul e Dilermando de Aguiar.

Neighbourhoods 
The district of Boca do Monte is divided in the following bairros, that in English is equivalent to neighbourhoods:
 Boca do Monte;

Roads and railway 
 In the district crosses the América Latina Logística railway cutting the portion north of the district.
 In the district crosses the following highways:
 BR-287: Crosses the district separating it in north and south. The roadway is the exit of Santa Maria to the municipalities of Mata, Santiago e São Borja.
 BR-158: In the boundary with the district of São Valentim
 RS-580: Covered with asphalt, connects the district's seat to BR-287 highway.

See also 
 District of Boca do Monte, in Portuguese wikipedia.

References

External links 
Site oficial da Prefeitura de Santa Maria

Districts of Santa Maria, Rio Grande do Sul